A list of Spanish-produced and co-produced feature films released in Spain in 1994.

Films

Box office 
The five highest-grossing Spanish films in 1994, by domestic box office gross revenue, are as follows:

See also 
 9th Goya Awards
 1994 in film

References

External links
 Spanish films of 1994 at the Internet Movie Database

1994
Spanish
Films